The Brock McGuire Band is an Irish Folk group fronted by Paul Brock and Manus McGuire. Residing in County Clare, button accordionist and melodeonist Paul Brock and fiddler Manus McGuire are two of Ireland’s most celebrated traditional musicians and have been at the forefront of Irish music for many years: They are joined by acclaimed composer Denis Carey on piano and dancer Dave Curley on banjo, mandolin and vocals.

The Brock McGuire Band is a tenacious blend of instruments emphasizing mostly Irish music but also sprinkling in impressive arrangements of American Old Timey, Bluegrass, French-Canadian, and other Celtic traditions.

In 2011, they collaborated with various Nashville musicians including 14 time Grammy Winner Ricky Skaggs to record, "Green Grass Blue Grass". An exploration of the connection between Irish Traditional Music and American Bluegrass and Appalachian music. The album was launched on the Grand Ole Opry, 11 March 2011.

Green Grass Blue Grass featured Ricky Skaggs on mandolin, Bryan Sutton on guitar, Aubrey Haynie on fiddle, Jeff Taylor on accordion and Mark Fain on Double Bass.
The album has been described by critics as "an adrenaline rush", "a masterpiece" and "virtuosity in full flight".

Notable Performances
Grand Ole Opry, Nashville, Tennessee
Cleveland Irish Festival, Cleveland, Ohio
Celtic Colours, Cape Breton
World Music Fest, Chicago, Illinois
Return to Camden Town Festival, London
National Concert Hall, Bogota, Colombia

The Band
Paul Brock   - Button Accordion/Melodeon
Manus McGuire    - Fiddle
Denis Carey      - Piano
Dave Curley     - Banjo/Mandolin/Vocal

Discography
Brock McGuire Band (2004)
Humdinger (2006)
Green Grass Blue Grass with Ricky Skaggs (2011)

Awards
 'Irish Music Album Of The Year' Irish Times for Humdinger (2006)
 5-star ‘Top of the World’ Songlines (magazine) (2011)
 ‘Instrumental Band of the Decade’ Irish American News (2011)

References
 Irish Music Magazine
 Compass Records Profile
 Green Linnet Artist bio
  Irish American Review
 Irish Times Review

External links
Official Website

Irish folk musical groups
Musicians from County Clare